Talmadge is a neighborhood of the mid-city region of San Diego, California. Its borders are defined by Fairmount Avenue to the West, Montezuma Road/Collwood Boulevard to the Northeast, and El Cajon Boulevard to the South.

It is named after the Talmadge sisters (Norma, Natalie and Constance), who were silent film stars. In 1927, the Talmadge sisters opened the Talmadge Park real estate development, which contains streets named for each of the sisters.

The architecture in Talmadge is eclectic, with styles including Spanish Revival, California bungalows, Cape Cod cottages and Normandy Style homes. Cliff May, a renowned Southern California architect, designed several homes in Talmadge. Kensington and Talmadge are sometimes grouped together as one community for official purposes, and they are part of the same community planning area.

References

External links 

 "Talmadge: A Community of San Diego"
 "Community Profiles Kensington-Talmadge"
 "Talmadge on OpenStreetMap.org"

Neighborhoods in San Diego
Urban communities in San Diego
Historic districts in San Diego